Gene Walet Jr. (September 24, 1901 – April 2, 1968) was an American sailor. He competed in the Dragon event at the 1956 Summer Olympics.

References

External links
 

1901 births
1968 deaths
American male sailors (sport)
Olympic sailors of the United States
Sailors at the 1956 Summer Olympics – Dragon
Sportspeople from New Orleans